Elmwood Village is a neighborhood in Buffalo, New York.

Geography 
Elmwood Village is in the central part of Buffalo. The neighborhood is located along Elmwood Avenue. The neighborhood is bordered on the south by the Allentown neighborhood. The northern boundary of the neighborhood abuts Buffalo State College and Delaware Park just beyond the Burchfield Penney Art Center. Its eastern boundary is Delaware Avenue (NY 384). The western boundary is Richmond Avenue, to the west is the West Side neighborhood.

Architecture

Historic Sites 
The following are the historic sites in the Elmwood Village of such significance as to be listed on the National Register of Historic Places.

Demographics 

In recent years, Elmwood has become a popular site for mixed-use residential and commercial sites. It features over 300 small local shops, coffeehouses, restaurants, bars, and art galleries. In 2007, Elmwood Village was named one of the 'Top 10 Great Places in America' by the American Planning Association.  SPoT Coffee opened one of their first locations within the village.

Parks and attractions
Bidwell Parkway, a component of Frederick Law Olmsted (1822-1903) and Calvert Vaux's original parkway system, was once one of Buffalo's most prestigious addresses. It is a residential boulevard 200 feet wide, running northwest diagonally between Colonial Circle and Soldiers Circle. It is named for Daniel Davidson Bidwell, heir to Buffalo Banta and Bidwell Shipbuilding Co, who was also active in Buffalo's pre-civil-war militia and instrumental in organizing the city's first Police force. Bidwell Parkway is the location of the Elmwood/Bidwell Farmers Market, a producers-only market that runs every Saturday from mid-May to the end of November from 8 am to 1 pm.
The Bidwell Parkway is also the location of the Annual Elmwood/Bidwell Free Summer Concert Series.

The Elmwood Avenue Festival of the Arts takes place annually on Elmwood Avenue between West Ferry Street and Delavan Avenue. The Festival is an all volunteer event and takes place the weekend before Labor Day weekend. It features local artists, craftspeople, musicians and community groups.

References

External links 
.
https://elmwoodartfest.org The Elmwood Avenue Festival of the Arts

Neighborhoods in Buffalo, New York